The Macon, Mississippi, race riot took place on June 7, 1919, in Macon, Mississippi. Members of the white community were angry that some people were organizing to fight for better work conditions and so beat, whipped and then forced them into exile.

Background

Macon has a long history of its white community  lynching members of its black community.

Riot
After hearing reports of black workers wanting to get better pay and work conditions a city marshal, a deputy sheriff, and a banker, accompanied by a white mob, attacked and beat several prominent blacks, including a school principal. Their crime was rumors of them of trying to organize blacks. After looting stores, the mob ordered the victims to leave Macon and never return. The News Scimitar reported it as the blacks were "taken across the river." The Columbus Dispatch reported that some of the blacks forced into exile were first whipped by white mobs.

Aftermath
It was one of 1919 Red Summer riots and is mentioned in Charles E. Haynes's influential report to Congress on them.

Bibliography 
Notes

References  
 - Total pages: 368 

  
 

African-American history of Mississippi
July 1919 events
Noxubee County, Mississippi
White American riots in the United States
Red Summer
Racially motivated violence against African Americans
Riots and civil disorder in Mississippi
History of racism in Mississippi